Doom 64 is a first-person shooter game by Midway Games. It was first released for the Nintendo 64 in 1997, as the second spin-off game in the Doom series after Final Doom (1996), and the fourth game in the series overall. A remastered port was developed by Nightdive Studios and published by Bethesda Softworks for Windows, Nintendo Switch, PlayStation 4, and Xbox One in March 2020, and for Stadia in May 2020.

Doom 64 was developed from 1994 by Midway Studios San Diego under supervision of id Software, the main developer of the Doom franchise, and was tentatively titled Doom: The Absolution. It has a customized version of the Doom engine, enabling new kinds of level geometry, and dynamic colored lighting. It has new sprite graphics for weapons and monsters.

It received positive reviews from critics, praising its graphics, level design, soundtrack, and general atmosphere, with some criticizing the lack of new gameplay elements compared to the previous games of the series. It gained a cult following, with several fan-made PC source ports and mods.

Gameplay

Doom 64 gameplay is similar to earlier Doom games. The player must advance through 28 story levels (and 4 secret levels) by battling demons, collecting weapons and keys, and activating switches to reach the level's exit while surviving deadly ambushes and traps. The Doom engine and gameplay elements were customized, and all visual assets such as weapon and monster graphics are unique to Doom 64.

Weapons
All the weapons from Doom II are present, but with new sprites and sound effects. The chainsaw has two blades instead of one, the fists have bloodstained gloves instead of brass knuckles, the plasma gun has an electric core that emits a sparking sound, the rocket launcher has a small kickback, the shotgun's priming handle is at the grip instead of under the barrel, and the double-barreled "Super" shotgun reloads faster and causes kickback.

A new weapon named the Unmaker which is a hit scan weapon, but looks like a projectile weapon uses the same cell ammunition as the plasma gun and BFG 9000. It had originated in the Doom Bible in 1992, and was planned for the original Doom in 1993, but never appeared. Its appearance in Doom 64 is its only official appearance prior to Doom Eternal, in which it is spelled "Unmaykr". With the power of three ancient artifacts found throughout the game, it becomes more powerful by shooting three laser beams (at a quicker rate than default) instead of one. The first artifact increases the laser speed, the second artifact adds a second laser, and the third artifact allows the weapon to fire three simultaneous lasers which can automatically aim separately from one another, allowing the weapon to attack three different enemies at once with huge amounts of rapid damage.

Plot
Following the Doom Marine's success at thwarting Hell in Doom, Doom II: Hell on Earth, and in the Final Doom storyline, a planetary policy is established to quarantine the U.A.C. research installations with apocalyptic levels of radiation. For years, the installations stood motionless and abandoned, until a long-forgotten satellite monitoring one of the installations, barely functioning due to years of being subjected to high levels of radiation, sends a message back to Earth.

The message indicates that a single entity, with vast rejuvenation powers and masked by the extreme radiation levels, escaped detection in its crippled state. This entity systematically altered decaying dead carnage back into corrupted living tissue, resurrecting the demons.

As the only experienced survivor of the Doom episodes, the Marine is sent in alone to exterminate them. Later, he realizes the demons had planned for this, after he unknowingly allowed himself to be lured back into Hell. The demons are unable to defeat him, and with the Unmaker, he eventually battles and kills the Mother Demon. The game ends with the Marine, no longer capable of having a normal life following his encounters with Hell's forces, deciding to remain in Hell forever to ensure no demon ever rises again.

In the Lost Levels from the 2020 remaster, the story continues as the Mother Demon was revealed to have a sister called the "Resurrector". It banishes the Marine back onto Phobos, forcing him to fight his way back to Hell to stop the Demons. It branches the storyline between the original games with the 2016 reboot of Doom and Doom Eternal.

Development
Doom 64 was developed by Midway Games at its San Diego studio. id Software, the primary developer of the Doom franchise, supervised the project. Development began in late 1994. Its tentative title of The Absolution was changed to Doom 64 for brand recognition, and reused as the name of the last level. Midway wanted to include every demon from the original games, and a few extra levels, into the final product, but deadlines and storage size constraints of the Nintendo 64 Game Pak cartridges made them exclude the levels and a few demons. Midway stated that a multiplayer mode was not included because Nintendo did not provide the necessary resources for multiplayer programming. Midway justified the decision based on alleged slowdown during split-screen multiplayer in other games on the console and the competitive nature of the mode. A Midway representative stated, "Everyone knows that the best part of playing multiplayer is not knowing where your opponent is and with a four-player split-screen, everyone can easily see where their opponents are."

The environments were built from 3-dimensional polygon models, and the enemies were created by pre-rendering sprites with SGI workstations. The Nightmare Imp was originally developed for the PlayStation version of Doom and appeared in a near-complete beta of the game, but was removed just prior to release for unknown reasons. It debuted in Doom 64 instead.

Doom 64 was slated to be a North American launch game but was postponed until April 1997. A Next Generation writer speculated that this was due to id Software having expressed dissatisfaction with the level designs, an assertion that is not otherwise substantiated. Nintendo's then-recent decision to remove the ability to run over animals from the Nintendo 64 version of Cruis'n USA raised concerns about the possibility of censoring Doom 64, but Midway vice president of software Mike Abbot said Nintendo had not voiced any concerns about the game's violent content. He pointed out that Cruis'n USA was perceived by the public as a family game, but the Doom series was targeted towards mature gamers, making violent content less of a concern.

The music and sound effects were composed by Aubrey Hodges, who had created the original sound effects and music for the PlayStation version two years earlier. The original Doom 64 team was working on a potential sequel titled Doom Absolution designed only for two-player deathmatches soon after the first game was released, but canceled it. Because id Software was impressed with the team's work on Doom 64, they were assigned to the Nintendo 64 version of Quake at this time.

Midway Home Entertainment shipped Doom 64 on March 29, 1997, for release on April 4.

Reception

By the time Doom 64 was released, the original Doom had been converted to nearly every platform capable of running it. Critics agreed that Doom 64 was by far the best-looking Doom to date, exceeding even the PC version. They were enthusiastic about the level designs, deeming them imaginative and much more challenging than those of the original Doom. A Next Generation critic remarked that "even the most skillful Doom fans will have their hands full. And pushing door switches often causes whole rooms to rearrange and fold out into new shapes."

However, most reviewers said that the new graphics and levels were not enough to keep the game from feeling like yet another port of the original Doom. Peer Schneider of IGN concluded, "Make no mistake about it, this is the best update to Doom so farbut if you've played the PC, PSX, SNES, Mac, Saturn, etc versions to death, you can do without this one." GamePro disagreed with the majority on this point, stating that "Doom 64 pumps the tried-and-true corridor-shooter formula full of life, with another challenging, intense experience that showcases the system's capabilities." They rated it a perfect 5.0 out of 5 in all four categories: graphics, sound, control, and fun factor. Shawn Smith of Electronic Gaming Monthly instead regarded the lack of advancements in the basic Doom gameplay as a positive: "Some of you may want to see your space Marine jumping around or swimming underwater. Purists wouldn't want these features added because Doom wasn't about that stuff. I'll have to agree with the purists."

Most critics praised the game's musical score for its atmospheric effect. Schneider and GamePro were both pleased with how well the analog control works, but Jeff Gerstmann of GameSpot said it was off and said of the game overall, "On paper, Doom 64 sounds better than the original could ever hope to be, but the end result feels more like a bastardization of the original." Comparing it to contemporary Nintendo 64 shooter Turok: Dinosaur Hunter, Schneider and GamePro both remarked that Doom 64 has less freedom of exploration and depth of control, but is more intense and "anxiety-filled".

Doom 64 has garnered a cult following, with multiple fan-made PC source ports compatible with PC WAD files. Most prominently, Doom 64 TC (2003) is a massive collaborative PC fan port led by Samuel Vilarreal to add numerous enemy variants and levels; and Doom 64 EX (2008) is a source port to re-create the original experience made by Vilarreal, who had worked on Doom 64 TC and a Nintendo DS port of Doom 64. Patrick Klepek from Kotaku described it as the most underrated Doom game. Others praised the game for some of the best and most unique level designs, and for its darker and more sinister tone in contrast to the intense and aggressive action of the original Doom.

Re-release
Versions of Doom 64 for PC, Nintendo Switch, PlayStation 4, and Xbox One by Nightdive Studios were released on March 20, 2020, and for Stadia on May 12, 2020. These were included as a bonus for pre-orders of Doom Eternal, which was released almost simultaneously. 

The re-release includes The Lost Levels expansion, additional missions intended "to connect 'old' Doom to 'new' Doom". The Doom Marine is forced out of hell by the Resurrector, the Mother Demon's sister, and must fight his way back to hell to slay the creature.

References

Further reading 

 

1997 video games
Doom (franchise) games
First-person shooters
Id Software games
Midway video games
1990s horror video games
Multiplayer and single-player video games
Nintendo 64 games
Nintendo Switch games
PlayStation 4 games
Video games about demons
Video games developed in the United States
Video games scored by Aubrey Hodges
Video games with 2.5D graphics
Windows games
Xbox Cloud Gaming games
Xbox One games
Video game spin-offs
Sprite-based first-person shooters
Stadia games
ja:DOOM#DOOM